Eduardo Dluzniewski (born September 22, 1952) is a former Uruguayan football referee. He is known for having supervised two matches during the 1995 Copa América in Uruguay: Argentina vs. Bolivia (2-1) and Ecuador vs. Peru (2-1).

Dluzniewski also officiated in 1998 World Cup qualifiers.

References

Profile at footballdatabase.eu
Profile at Worldreferee.com

1952 births
Living people
Uruguayan football referees
Copa América referees
Uruguayan people of Polish descent